This is a list of European Academy Award winners and nominees, which includes people born and/or raised in Europe and people born outside of Europe who are citizens of European countries.

Best Picture

Best Director

Best Actor in a Leading Role

Best Actress in a Leading Role

Best Actor in a Supporting Role

Best Actress in a Supporting Role

Best Original Screenplay

Best Adapted Screenplay
During certain ceremonies the Oscars only gave out one screenplay awards. If a screenplay is original, it will be noted as such.

Best Story

Best Animated Feature

Best Animated Short Film

Best Cinematography

Best Film Editing

Best Makeup and Hairstyling

Best Original Score

Best International Feature Film

References 

Lists of Academy Award winners and nominees by nationality or region